In Your Face may refer to:

Music
In Your Face (Fishbone album), 1986
In Your Face (Kingdom Come album), 1989
In Your Face (b4-4 album), 2003
In Your Face 1982–1990, a 2007 compilation album by the band Smack
"In Your Face", a song by Cat Power from her 2018 album Wanderer
"In Your Face", a song released in 2005 by Children of Bodom from Are You Dead Yet?
"In Your Face", a song by Lil Wayne from his 2009 album Rebirth
"In Your Face", a song from Ty Herndon's 1995 debut album What Mattered Most
"In Yer Face", released in 1991 by 808 State

Other
In Your Face, the title given to the 1977 blaxploitation film Abar, the First Black Superman when it was released on VHS in 2009